The 1938 Auburn Tigers football team represented Auburn University in the 1938 college football season. The Tigers' were led by head coach Jack Meagher in his fifth season and finished the season with a record of four wins, five losses and one tie (4–5–1 overall, 3–3–1 in the SEC).

Schedule

References

Auburn
Auburn Tigers football seasons
Auburn Tigers football